Ultra sport or ultrasport or variation, may refer to:

 Wills Wing Ultra Sport (aka UltraSport), a hang-glider
 SlipStream Ultra Sport, a U.S. light-sport-aircraft kit plane
 American Sportscopter Ultrasport, a series of U.S. helicopters
 Anderson Ultra Sport, a U.S. automobile
 'Ultra Sport', a trim package for the Audi A4
 Ultrasport, a Norwegian extreme sports magazine
 Ultrasport (talk show), a Bulgarian weekly television sports talk show

See also

 LAE Ultrasport 496T, a Cypriot helicopter
 
 
 Super sport (disambiguation)
 Hypersport (disambiguation)
 Megasport (disambiguation)
 Ultra (disambiguation)
 Sport (disambiguation)